James Alexander Hood (November 10, 1942 – January 17, 2013) was one of the first African Americans to enroll at the University of Alabama in 1963, and was made famous when Alabama Governor George Wallace attempted to block him and fellow student Vivian Malone from enrolling at the then all-white university, an incident which became known as the "Stand in the Schoolhouse Door".

On June 11, 1963, in a ceremonial demonstration, Wallace stood in front of the university's Foster Auditorium. Hood arrived to pay his fees, accompanied by Vivian Malone and Deputy Attorney General Nicholas Katzenbach. Wallace intended to keep true to his promise of upholding segregation in the state and stopping "integration at the schoolhouse door". As Malone and Hood waited in a car, Deputy Attorney General Katzenbach and a small team of federal marshals confronted Wallace to demand that he step aside and allow Malone and Hood entry, by order of the state court. Wallace not only refused the order, he interrupted Katzenbach and, in front of the crowds of media crews surrounding him, delivered a short, symbolic speech concerning state sovereignty, claiming that: "The unwelcomed, unwanted, unwarranted and force-induced intrusion upon the campus of the University of Alabama... of the might of the Central Government offers frightful example of the oppression of the rights, privileges and sovereignty of this State by officers of the Federal Government."

After seeing that Wallace would not step aside, Katzenbach called upon the assistance of President John F. Kennedy to force Wallace to permit the black students' entry into the university. President Kennedy federalized the Alabama National Guard later the same day, which put them under the command of the President, rather than the Governor of Alabama. Guardsmen escorted Hood and Malone back to the auditorium, where Wallace moved aside at the request of General Henry Graham. Hood and Malone then entered the building, albeit through another door.

Hood left the university after only two months, but returned in 1995 to begin earning his doctorate degree. On May 17, 1997, he received a Ph.D. in interdisciplinary studies. Wallace planned to give Hood his degree, but poor health prevented him from attending the ceremony. Hood himself was convinced Wallace had been sincere about this, as he wrote in an interchange following a PBS documentary on Wallace, Setting the Woods on Fire. Hood attended Wallace's funeral in 1998, imploring others to forgive Wallace as he had, since Wallace had publicly apologized for his previous actions.

Hood received a bachelor's degree from Michigan's Wayne State University and a master's degree from Michigan State University. He later moved to Wisconsin, where he worked at the Madison Area Technical College for 26 years. He retired in 2002 as chairman of public safety services in charge of police and fire training. He then moved back to Gadsden, Alabama, the city in which he was born, where he died at home on January 17, 2013, at the age of 70.

See also
 Stand in the Schoolhouse Door

References

1942 births
2013 deaths
People from Gadsden, Alabama
Activists for African-American civil rights
Burials in Alabama
School desegregation pioneers
University of Alabama alumni
Activists from Alabama